Ma Lan (born September 1958) is a Chinese biologist and the current chairwoman of the Institute of Brain Science, Fudan University.

Education
Ma was born in Shenyang, Liaoning in September 1958, while her ancestral home in Pingding County, Shanxi. In 1977 she entered Shenyang Pharmaceutical University. In 1984 she obtained her master of immunology degree from China Medical University (PRC). Then she pursued advanced studies in the United States, earning her Ph.D. in biochemistry from the University of North Carolina in 1990. She did post-doctoral research at the University of North Carolina and then Bayer AG between 1991 and 1995.

Career
Ma returned to China in 1995 and that same year became professor at Shanghai Medical College.

In January 2018, she was elected a delegate to the 13th National People's Congress.

Personal life
Ma is married to Pei Gang, who is also a member of the Chinese Academy of Sciences (CAS).

Honours and awards
 November 22, 2019 Member of the Chinese Academy of Sciences (CAS)

References

1958 births
Living people
People from Shenyang
People from Pingding County
Shenyang Pharmaceutical University alumni
China Medical University (PRC) alumni
University of North Carolina alumni
Biologists from Liaoning
Members of the Chinese Academy of Sciences
Delegates to the 13th National People's Congress
Chinese women biologists